Gordon Walter Herbert (born February 16, 1959) is a Canadian-Finnish professional basketball coach and a retired professional basketball player. He is the head coach of the Germany national team.

Playing career
Herbert attended two-year North Idaho College in Coeur d'Alene, and transferred to the University of Idaho in Moscow in 1979, where he played college basketball for the Vandals under head coach Don Monson.

As a fifth-year senior in 1981–82, Herbert started at forward and Idaho won its first sixteen games, went  in the regular season, and were sixth in the AP and UPI  They advanced to the Sweet Sixteen, and finished with the best record in school history  While undefeated at 15–0, an article on the team appeared in Sports Illustrated. Late in the regular season, Herbert was the conference player of the week.

After college, he played professionally in Finland for 12 years with various teams. His club playing career ended in 1994, when he started coaching.

Herbert also played with the senior Canadian national team at the 1984 Summer Olympics, where they finished just out of medal position in fourth place. He also played with Canada at the 1986 FIBA World Championship.

Coaching career
Herbert has coached many teams, including Frankfurt Skyliners, with which he won the German League title in 2004. He led the Skyliners to their 3rd German League finals appearance, against the league's first place Brose Bamberg, after beating other top-rated German teams, such as Alba Berlin, in the playoffs. He also coached French teams Paris and Pau Orthez, with which he won the French Cup in the 2006–07 season.

On July 7, 2007, he officially became the head basketball coach of the Greek club Aris. Herbert has also been an assistant coach of the NBA's Toronto Raptors. In the 2015–16 season, Herbert won the FIBA Europe Cup with the Skyliners, after his team defeated Pallacanestro Varese in the Final. Herbert was also named the German Basketball Bundesliga Coach of the Year that season.

Herbert's contract with the Skyliners ended in May 2020. On July 2, 2020, he signed with Avtodor of the VTB United League. He was sacked in March 2021. In September 2021, he was named head coach of the Germany national team. He guided the German team to a bronze medal at the 2022 European Championships.

Coaching titles
Skyliners Frankfurt (2001–04, 2010–11, 2013–present): 
Basketball Bundesliga: 2003–04 
FIBA Europe Cup: 2015–16 
Élan Béarnais Pau-Orthez (2006–07): 
French Cup: 2006–07 
Espoon Honka (1996–99, 2009–10): 
Finnish Cup: 2009

See also
 List of foreign NBA coaches

References

External links
FIBA Player Profile
Euroleague.net Coach Profile

1959 births
Living people
Alba Berlin basketball coaches
Aris B.C. coaches
Basketball people from British Columbia
Basketball players at the 1984 Summer Olympics
Canadian expatriate basketball people in Finland
Canadian expatriate basketball people in France
Canadian expatriate basketball people in Germany
Canadian expatriate basketball people in Greece
Canadian expatriate basketball people in the United States
Canadian men's basketball coaches
Canadian men's basketball players
FIBA Europe Cup-winning coaches
Idaho Vandals men's basketball players
Junior college men's basketball players in the United States
Medalists at the 1983 Summer Universiade
Olympic basketball players of Canada
Paris Racing Basket coaches
Skyliners Frankfurt coaches
Small forwards
Sportspeople from Penticton
Toronto Raptors assistant coaches
Universiade gold medalists for Canada
Universiade medalists in basketball